Aurelius John Lamothe Marie (23 December 1904 – 28 September 1995) was a Dominican politician and jurist who served as the second President of Dominica from 1980 to 1983.

Political career 
He served as a magistrate and jurist before his election. On 25 February 1980, the House of Assembly then elected Aurelius Marie as president. Marie took the Oath of Office the following day before Justice Cecil Hewlett. He served as president until 1983.

References

1904 births
1995 deaths
Presidents of Dominica
Dominica politicians